Villaz is a municipality in the district of Glâne in the canton of Fribourg in Switzerland. On 1 January 2020 the former municipalities of Villaz-Saint-Pierre and La Folliaz merged to form the new municipality of Villaz.

History

Villaz
Villaz-Saint-Pierre is first mentioned in 1177 as Villa.

Villarimboud
Villarimboud is first mentioned in 1142 as Vilarrimolth.

Lussy
Lussy is first mentioned in the 12th century as Lussiei.

Geography

Demographics

Historic Population
The historical population is given in the following chart: La Folliaz was formed on 1 January 2005 from the union of the former municipalities of Lussy and Villarimboud.

Transportation
The municipality has a railway station, on the Lausanne–Bern line.

References

External links

 

Municipalities of the canton of Fribourg